Ictis, or Iktin, is or was an island described as a tin trading centre in the Bibliotheca historica of the Sicilian-Greek historian Diodorus Siculus, writing in the first century BC.

While Ictis is widely accepted to have been an island somewhere off the southern coast of what is now England, scholars continue to debate its precise location. Candidates include St Michael's Mount and Looe Island off the coast of Cornwall, the Mount Batten peninsula in Devon, and the Isle of Wight further to the east.

Primary sources
Diodorus Siculus, who flourished between about 60 and about 30 BC, is supposed to have relied for his account of the geography of Britain on a lost work of Pytheas, a Greek geographer from Massalia who made a voyage around the coast of Britain near the end of the fourth century BC, searching for the source of amber. The record of the voyage of Pytheas was lost in antiquity but was known to some later writers, including Timaeus, Posidonius, and Pliny the Elder. Their work is contradictory, but from it deductions can be made about what was reported by Pytheas. This “represents all that was known about the tin trade in the ancient classical world”.

Diodorus gives an account that is generally supposed to be a description of the working of Cornish tin at about the time of the voyage of Pytheas. He says:

 

In the Greek text of Diodorus the name appears, in the accusative case, as "Iktin", so that translators have inferred that the nominative form of the name was "Iktis", rendering this into the medieval lingua franca of Latin (which only rarely used the letter 'k') as "Ictis". However, some commentators doubt that "Ictis" is correct and prefer "Iktin".

In Book IV of his Natural History, Pliny quotes Timaeus and refers to "insulam Mictim" (the island of Mictis, or perhaps of Mictim): 

It has been suggested that "insulam Mictim" was a copying error for insulam Ictim, and Diodorus and Pliny probably both relied on the same primary source. However, while it is possible that "Mictim" and "Iktin" are one and the same, it is also possible that they are different places. The word "inwards" (introrsus) can be interpreted as meaning "towards our home", and six days' sail from Britain could take a boat to somewhere on the Atlantic coast of what is now France.

Strabo, a contemporary of Diodorus, stated in his Geography that British tin was shipped from Massalia on the Mediterranean coast of Gaul.

Julius Caesar, in his De Bello Gallico, says of the Veneti: "This last-named people were by far the most powerful on the coast of Armorica: they had a large fleet plying between their own ports and Britain; they knew more about the handling of ships and the science of navigation than anyone else thereabouts."

Debate

William Camden, the Elizabethan historian, took the view that the name "Ictis" was so similar to "Vectis", the Latin name for the Isle of Wight, that the two were probably the same island. The Cornish antiquary William Borlase (1696–1772) suggested that Ictis must have been near the coast of Cornwall and could have been a general name for a peninsula there.

In 1960, Gavin de Beer concluded that the most likely location of Iktin (the form of the name he preferred) was St Michael's Mount, a tidal island near the town of Marazion in Cornwall. Apart from the effect of the tide being consistent with what is said by Diodorus, de Beer considered the other benefits of St Michael's Mount for the Britons. This identification is supported by the Roman Britain website.

In 1972, I. S. Maxwell weighed up the competing claims of no fewer than twelve possible sites. In 1983, after excavations, the archaeologist Barry W. Cunliffe proposed the Mount Batten peninsula near Plymouth as the site of Ictis. Near the mouth of the River Erme, not far away, a shipwreck site has produced ingots of ancient tin, which indicates a trade along the coast, although dating the site is difficult and it may not belong to the Bronze Age.

The assessment of Miranda Aldhouse-Green in The Celtic World (1996) was that

See also

Mining in Cornwall and Devon
Tin sources and trade in ancient times

Notes

Further reading
Gavin de Beer, 'Iktin', in The Geographical Journal vol. 126 (June 1960)
I. S. Maxwell, 'The location of Ictis' in Journal of the Royal Institution of Cornwall 6 (4) (1972)
Barry W. Cunliffe, 'Ictis: Is it here?' in Oxford Journal of Archaeology, vol. 2, issue 1 (March 1983)
John Taylor, [https://www.academia.edu/26576329/Albion_the_earliest_history Albion: the earliest history"] (Dublin, 2016)
S. Mitchell, Cornish tin, Julius Caesar, and the invasion of Britain (1983)
Christopher F. C. Hawkes, 'Ictis disentangled and the British tin trade' in Oxford Journal of Archaeology, 3 (1984), pp. 211–233
R. D. Penhallurick, Tin in Antiquity'' (London, 1986)

Ancient Britain
Islands of England
Tin mining
Ancient Greek geography of Britain